Camille Cottin (born 1 December 1978) is a French actress and comedian. Following her debut as a stage actress, she became known in 2013 for playing a capricious Parisian woman in the Canal+ hidden camera-sketches series Connasse (2013–2015), as well as in the theatrical film based on the series The Parisian Bitch, Princess of Hearts (2015), which brought her significant mainstream success in France.

Cottin's international recognition grew with the role of Andréa Martel in the France 2 drama series Call My Agent! (2015–present). She subsequently had leading roles in films such as Baby Bumps (2017), Dumped (2018), Photo de famille (2018), The Mystery of Henri Pick (2019) and The Dazzled (2019). She made her English-language debut in Robert Zemeckis's thriller film Allied (2016), followed by the BBC America drama series Killing Eve (2020–2022). In 2021, she starred opposite Matt Damon in Stillwater and in Ridley Scott's biographical crime film House of Gucci.

Life and career 
Cottin was born in Paris, but spent her teenage years in London before returning to France, where she became a high school English teacher. At the same time, she took classes at a theatre and dramatic art school and then with the company "Théâtre du Voyageur". She played small roles in many films and television series. In 2009, she joined the "Troupe à Palmade". She appeared the same year in an advertisement for a Japanese telephone, directed by Wes Anderson with Brad Pitt, with music by Serge Gainsbourg with the song "Poupée de cire, poupée de son" sung by France Gall.

In 2013, she played the main role in Connasse on Canal+ produced by Silex Films, a series consisting of sketches in candid camera of less than two minutes each. Written by Noémie Saglio and Éloïse Lang, the episodes were broadcast on Le Grand Journal and became available on DVD from 4 March 2014. She later appeared in the film based on the series titled The Parisian Bitch, Princess of Hearts, released in 2015.

In 2015, Cottin played the lead role of agent Andréa Martel in Call My Agent!, a television series which has run for four seasons (a fifth season and a movie are in the pipeline) that was first broadcast on France 2 and which later enjoyed wide international distribution on Netflix; Cottin won a Best Actress ACS Award for her role. In 2016, Cottin appeared in Allied, In the Shadow of Iris and The Fabulous Patars.

In 2022, she joined the all star cast of the mystery film A Haunting in Venice, directed by Kenneth Branagh.

Personal life 
Camille Cottin is the daughter of artist Gilles Cottin. 
Her great-great-grandfather was historian Paul Cottin, former director of Bibliotheque de l'Arsenal.

Cottin has been in a relationship with architect Benjamin Mahon since 2005. They have two children, a son born in 2009, and a daughter born in August 2015. Cottin and Nahon are not married. Cottin said she is against marriage. "Even if I plan to spend the rest of my life with him, I want to feel this share of freedom that previous generations have allowed us to acquire. This possibility of saying: "If I am not happy, I leave."

Filmography

Film

Television

Awards and nominations

References

External links 

 

1978 births
French film actresses
French television actresses
French stage actresses
Actresses from Paris
Living people
21st-century French actresses
French comedians
French women comedians